Milam Township was a civil township in Macon County, Illinois. The population was 95 at the 2000 census. In 2009, it was merged into Mount Zion Township.

Adjacent townships 
 Mount Zion Township (north)
 Dora Township, Moultrie County (northeast and east)
 Marrowbone Township, Moultrie County (east and southeast)
 Penn Township, Shelby County (south)
 Moweaqua Township, Shelby County (southwest)
 South Macon Township (west and northwest)

References

External links 
US Census
City-data.com
Illinois State Archives

Former townships in Illinois
Former populated places in Illinois
Townships in Macon County, Illinois
Populated places disestablished in 2009